Jared Friedman (born 1984) is an American entrepreneur and angel investor. He is a partner at Y Combinator in San Francisco, where he invests in and helps startups. Previously, Jared was the co-founder and CTO at Scribd, a digital library and document-sharing platform, which has 80 million users.

Scribd
Friedman co-founded Scribd with fellow Harvard University student Trip Adler. The pair attended Y Combinator in the summer of 2006, and launched Scribd from a San Francisco apartment in March 2007. In 2008, Scribd ranked as one of the top 20 social media sites according to Comscore. In June 2009, Scribd launched Scribd Store, and shortly thereafter closed a deal with Simon & Schuster to sell ebooks on Scribd. In 2012, the company became profitable.

In October 2013, Scribd launched a subscription ebook service, and signed a deal with HarperCollins to make their backlist books available on Scribd. Scribd currently has more than 300,000 titles from 1,000 publishers in its book subscription service.

As CTO, Friedman led one of the earliest and largest site-wide transitions of Adobe Flash to HTML5. Friedman was also notably opposed to the Stop Online Piracy Act (SOPA), and was quoted in Bloomberg, The Washington Post, VentureBeat, ArsTechnica, TechCrunch, and Fox News. In protest to the bill, Scribd pulled its entire database—over 1,000,000,000 documents—from the internet on January 18, 2012 for one day. Three days later, SOPA was postponed, which press outlets reported as the "death" of the bill.

Angel investor
Friedman is also an angel investor. His investments and advisory positions include: Parse (company), Swiftype, Creative Market, Vayable, MuckerLab, FundersClub, Goldbelly, Instacart, JamLegend, Rickshaw, Madison Reed, Marco Polo, Colourlovers, Copyin, and Appszoom.

Friedman became the 16th full-time partner at Y Combinator in October 2015.

Honors
Named to TIME’s list of tech pioneers of 2010

References

External links
 Jared Friedman on Twitter

American investors
American chief technology officers
Harvard University alumni
Angel investors
American technology company founders
1984 births
Living people
Y Combinator people